George H. Wells (September 1, 1833 – February 1, 1905) was a New-York native who became a Confederate Army officer and later served as a Democratic member of the Louisiana State Senate representing Lake Charles, Louisiana.

References
 "George H. Wells", A Dictionary of Louisiana Biography, Vol. 2 (1988), p. 832
 William Henry Perrin, Southwest Louisiana, Biographical and Historical (1891 and 1971 reprint)
 Wells obituary, Lake Charles American Press, March 3, 1905

1833 births
1905 deaths
Politicians from Schenectady, New York
Military personnel from Schenectady, New York
Confederate States Army officers
People of Louisiana in the American Civil War
Northern-born Confederates
District attorneys in Louisiana
Louisiana state senators
Methodists from Louisiana
People from Lake Charles, Louisiana